Pearcey may refer to:

Jackie Pearcey (born 1963), Liberal Democrat politician in the City of Manchester, England
Jason Pearcey (born 1971), former professional footballer
Mary Pearcey (1866–1890), English woman who was executed for murdering her lover's wife and child
Nancy Pearcey (born 1952), American author who is a prominent intelligent design proponent and Christian activist
Trevor Pearcey (1919–1998), British born Australian scientist who created CSIRAC, one of the first stored program electronic computers

See also
Pearcey Award, set of prizes presented annually since 1998 by the Pearcey Foundation for achievement in the Australian ICT industry
Pearcey Foundation, Australian organization dedicated to raising the profile of the Australian ICT industry